Amphidromus iunior is a species of medium-sized air-breathing tree snail, an arboreal gastropod mollusk in the family Camaenidae.

Distribution 
Indonesia, Sumba Isaland.

Etymology 
The species is named for the youngest son of John Abbas, who encountered this hitherto unrecorded species during one of his expeditions. Another species of Amphidromus named for John, A. (S.) abbasi, is closely related to this species, but is significantly larger, amongst other differences. The meaning of iunior therefore takes on another meaning, referring to the relative size of the snail (iunior is the comparative form of iuvenis, meaning young in Latin).

References

External links
 263-268 Cilia, D.P. (2013). Description of a new species of Amphidromus Albers, 1850 from Sumba,Indonesia (Gastropoda Pulmonata Camaenidae). Biodiversity Journal.

Gastropods described in 2013
Camaenidae
Gastropods of Asia